The 2011 BNP Paribas Masters, also known as the Paris Masters, was an ATP World Tour professional men's tennis tournament played on indoor hard courts. It was the 39th edition of the tournament which was part of the 2011 ATP World Tour. It took place in Paris, France between 7 and 13 November 2011. Third-seeded Roger Federer won the singles title.

Finals

Singles

 Roger Federer defeated  Jo-Wilfried Tsonga, 6–1, 7–6(7–3)
It was Federer's 3rd title of the year and 69th of his career. It was his 1st Masters of the year and 18th of his career. He became the only player to reach the final of all 9 Masters events.

Doubles

 Rohan Bopanna /  Aisam-ul-Haq Qureshi defeated  Julien Benneteau /  Nicolas Mahut, 6–2, 6–4

Points and prize money

Points

Prize money

ATP entrants

Seeds

 1 Rankings are as of 31 October 2011.

Other entrants
The following players received wildcards into the singles main draw:
  Julien Benneteau
  Jérémy Chardy
  Adrian Mannarino

The following players received entry as a special exempt into the singles main draw:
  Kei Nishikori

The following players received entry from the qualifying draw:

  Santiago Giraldo
  Philipp Kohlschreiber
  Nicolas Mahut
  Andreas Seppi
  Sergiy Stakhovsky
  Donald Young

The following players received entry from a lucky loser spot:
  Igor Kunitsyn

Withdrawals
  Rafael Nadal (training)
  Robin Söderling (mononucleosis)
  Jürgen Melzer (back injury)
  Ivan Ljubičić
  Juan Ignacio Chela
  Juan Martín del Potro (shoulder injury)

References

External links
 Official website
 ATP tournament profile
 ITF tournament edition details